Jonathan Shafer (born June 17, 2005) is an American professional stock car racing driver. He competes part-time in the ARCA Menards Series, driving the No. 15/55 Toyota Camrys for Venturini Motorsports, and full-time in the CARS Late Model Stock Tour, driving the No. 91 Toyota Camry for Lee Pulliam Motorsports.

Racing career

Early career 
Shafer would start driving at five years old, racing in quarter midgets. He would race in them for several years, getting wins and championships. In 2017, at the age of twelve, he would drive in the Champion Racing Association for two years. When he turned fourteen, he would drive micro sprints in the POWRi Midget Racing for Keith Kunz Motorsports, and continue to run late model races.

CARS Late Model Stock Tour 
He joined the CARS Late Model Stock Tour in 2020 for Nelson Motorsports, running all but one race that season, earning four top tens and one top-five, ranking ninth in the final standings. He would sign with Lee Pulliam Motorsports to run a full-time schedule in 2021, getting six top tens and four top fives, finishing seventh in points.

ARCA Menards Series 
On January 4, 2022, Shafer would sign with Venturini Motorsports to drive a part-time schedule in the 2022 ARCA Menards Series. The number is TBA and will be announced at a later date.

Motorsports career results

ARCA Menards Series

ARCA Menards Series East

Personal life 
Jonathan is the son of former NASCAR and ARCA driver, Todd Shafer, who primarily raced in the NASCAR Camping World Truck Series and NASCAR Busch Series (now NASCAR Xfinity Series). He is currently a junior in high school.

References

External links 

Living people
2005 births
ARCA Menards Series drivers
NASCAR drivers
Racing drivers from Ohio
Sportspeople from Ohio